Johann Anetseder (7 October 1898 - 12 December 1948) was a German politician, representative of the Christian Social Union of Bavaria. He was a member of the Landtag of Bavaria from December 1946 - December 1948.
He was born in Aichet (Thyrnau) and died in Kellberg near Thyrnau.

See also
List of Bavarian Christian Social Union politicians

References

Christian Social Union in Bavaria politicians
1898 births
1948 deaths